The United States of America has sent athletes to every celebration of the Youth Olympic Games. The United States Olympic Committee (USOC) is the National Olympic Committee for the United States.

U.S. athletes have won a total of 61 medals (20 of them gold) at the Summer Youth Olympic Games and another 35 at the Winter Youth Olympic Games. Most medals have been won in athletics (track and field) (13) and snowboarding (11). American skier Robin Reynolds is the most-decorated Youth Olympic athlete of the United States, with 3 medals (all gold).

The United States has never topped the gold medal count (as the medals are listed internationally by tradition) at a Summer Youth Olympics and only at one Winter Youth Olympics.

Medal tables

Medals by summer sport

Medals by winter sport

See also
United States at the Olympics
United States at the Paralympics

References

External links
 
 
 

 
Nations at the Youth Olympic Games